Proper motion is the astrometric measure of the observed changes in the apparent places of stars or other celestial objects in the sky, as seen from the center of mass of the Solar System, compared to the abstract background of the more distant stars.

The components for proper motion in the equatorial coordinate system (of a given epoch, often J2000.0) are given in the direction of right ascension (μα) and of declination (μδ). Their combined value is computed as the total proper motion (μ). It has dimensions of angle per time, typically arcseconds per year or milliarcseconds per year.

Knowledge of the proper motion, distance, and radial velocity allows calculations of an object's motion from our star system's frame of reference and its motion from the galactic frame of reference – that is motion in respect to the Sun, and by coordinate transformation, that in respect to the Milky Way.

Introduction 

Over the course of centuries, stars appear to maintain nearly fixed positions with respect to each other, so that they form the same constellations over historical time. Ursa Major or Crux, for example, look nearly the same now as they did hundreds of years ago. However, precise long-term observations show that the constellations change shape, albeit very slowly, and that each star has an independent motion.

This motion is caused by the movement of the stars relative to the Sun and Solar System.

Any proper motion is a two-dimensional vector (as it excludes the component as to the direction of the line of sight) and it bears two quantities or characteristics: its position angle and its magnitude. The first is the direction of the proper motion on the celestial sphere (with 0 degrees meaning the motion is north, 90 degrees meaning the motion is east, (left on most sky maps and space telescope images) and so on), and the second is its magnitude, typically expressed in arcseconds per year (symbols: arcsec/yr, as/yr, ″/yr, ″ yr−1) or milliarcseconds per year (symbols: mas/yr, mas yr−1).

Proper motion may alternatively be defined by the angular changes per year in the star's right ascension (μα) and declination (μδ) with respect to a constant epoch.

The components of proper motion by convention are arrived at as follows. Suppose an object moves from coordinates (α1, δ1) to coordinates (α2, δ2) in a time Δt. The proper motions are given by:

The magnitude of the proper motion μ is given by the Pythagorean theorem:

technically abbreviated:

where δ is the declination. The factor in cos2δ accounts for the widening of the lines (hours) of right ascension away from the poles, cosδ, being zero for a hypothetical object fixed at a celestial pole in declination. Thus, a co-efficient is given to negate the misleadingly greater east or west velocity (angular change in α) in hours of Right Ascension the further it is towards the imaginary infinite poles, above and below the earth's axis of rotation, in the sky.  The change μα, which must be multiplied by cosδ to become a component of the proper motion, is sometimes called the "proper motion in right ascension", and μδ the "proper motion in declination".

If the proper motion in right ascension has been converted by cosδ, the result is designated μα*. For example, the proper motion results in right ascension in the Hipparcos Catalogue (HIP) have already been converted.  Hence, the individual proper motions in right ascension and declination are made equivalent for straightforward calculations of various other stellar motions.

The position angle θ is related to these components by:

Motions in equatorial coordinates can be converted to motions in galactic coordinates.

Examples 

For most stars seen in the sky, the observed proper motions are small and unremarkable. Such stars are often either faint or are significantly distant, have changes of below 0.01″ per year, and do not appear to move appreciably over many millennia. A few do have significant motions, and are usually called high-proper motion stars. Motions can also be in almost seemingly random directions. Two or more stars, double stars or open star clusters, which are moving in similar directions, exhibit so-called shared or common proper motion (or cpm.), suggesting they may be gravitationally attached or share similar motion in space.

Barnard's Star has the largest proper motion of all stars, moving at 10.3″ yr−1. Large proper motion usually strongly indicates an object is close to the Sun. This is so for Barnard's Star, about 6 light-years away. After the Sun and the Alpha Centauri system, it is the nearest known star. Being a red dwarf with an apparent magnitude of 9.54, it is too faint to see without a telescope or powerful binoculars. Of the stars visible to the naked eye (conservatively limiting unaided visual magnitude to 6.0), 61 Cygni A (magnitude V=5.20) has the highest proper motion at 5.281″ yr−1, discounting Groombridge 1830 (magnitude V=6.42), proper motion: 7.058″ yr−1.

A proper motion of 1 arcsec per year 1 light-year away corresponds to a relative transverse speed of 1.45 km/s. Barnard's Star's transverse speed is 90 km/s and its radial velocity is 111 km/s (perpendicular (at a right, 90° angle), which gives a true or "space" motion of 142 km/s. True or absolute motion is more difficult to measure than the proper motion, because the true transverse velocity involves the product of the proper motion times the distance. As shown by this formula, true velocity measurements depend on distance measurements, which are difficult in general.

In 1992 Rho Aquilae became the first star to have its Bayer designation invalidated by moving to a neighbouring constellation – it is now in Delphinus.

Usefulness in astronomy 

Stars with large proper motions tend to be nearby; most stars are far enough away that their proper motions are very small, on the order of a few thousandths of an arcsecond per year.  It is possible to construct nearly complete samples of high proper motion stars by comparing photographic sky survey images taken many years apart. The Palomar Sky Survey is one source of such images. In the past, searches for high proper motion objects were undertaken using blink comparators to examine the images by eye. More modern techniques such as image differencing can scan digitized images, or comparisons to star catalogs obtained by satellites. As any selection biases of these surveys are well understood and quantifiable, studies have confirmed more and inferred approximate quantities of unseen stars – revealing and confirming more by studying them further, regardless of brightness, for instance.  Studies of this kind show most of the nearest stars are intrinsically faint and angularly small, such as red dwarfs.

Measurement of the proper motions of a large sample of stars in a distant stellar system, like a globular cluster, can be used to compute the cluster's total mass via the Leonard-Merritt mass estimator. Coupled with measurements of the stars' radial velocities, proper motions can be used to compute the distance to the cluster.

Stellar proper motions have been used to infer the presence of a super-massive black hole at the center of the Milky Way. This black hole is suspected to be Sgr A*, with a mass of 4.2 ×  (solar masses).

Proper motions of the galaxies in the Local Group are discussed in detail in Röser. In 2005, the first measurement was made of the proper motion of the Triangulum Galaxy M33, the third largest and only ordinary spiral galaxy in the Local Group, located 0.860 ± 0.028 Mpc beyond the Milky Way. The motion of the Andromeda Galaxy was measured in 2012, and an Andromeda–Milky Way collision is predicted in about 4.5 billion years. Proper motion of the NGC 4258 (M106) galaxy in the M106 group of galaxies was used in 1999 to find an accurate distance to this object.

History 

Proper motion was suspected by early astronomers (according to Macrobius, AD 400) but a proof was not provided until 1718 by Edmund Halley, who noticed that Sirius, Arcturus and Aldebaran were over half a degree away from the positions charted by the ancient Greek astronomer Hipparchus roughly 1850 years earlier.

The lesser meaning of "proper" used is arguably dated English (but neither historic, nor obsolete when used as a postpositive, as in "the city proper") meaning "belonging to" or "own". "Improper motion" would refer to perceived motion that is nothing to do with an object's inherent course, such as due to earth's axial precession, and minor deviations, nutations well within the 26,000-year cycle.

Stars with high proper motion 

The following are the stars with highest proper motion from the Hipparcos catalog. It does not include stars such as Teegarden's Star, which are too faint for that catalog. A more complete list of stellar objects can be made by doing a criterion query at the SIMBAD astronomical database.

The figure for HIP 67593 is almost certainly an error, probably because the star has a relatively nearby brighter visual binary companion; the movement between the DSS2 and SDSS9 images is less than it. Gaia measured a much smaller proper motion for its Data Release 2, yet a 15-fold parallax between it and its likely common-proper-motion companion HIP 67594.  Reconciling its distance and motion will have to wait for Data Release 3 expected to analyse well very high proper motion objects.

See also
 Astronomical coordinate systems
 Galaxy rotation curve
 Leonard–Merritt mass estimator
 Milky Way
 Peculiar velocity
 Radial velocity
 Relative velocity
 Solar apex
 Space velocity (astronomy)
 Very-long-baseline interferometry

References

External links 
 Hipparcos: High Proper Motion Stars
 Edmond Halley: Discovery of proper motions

Astrometry
Stellar astronomy
Motion (physics)
Concepts in astronomy